{{Automatic taxobox
|fossil_range =  Middle Paleocene to Late Eocene
|image =
|image_caption =
|taxon = Boualitomidae
|authority = Borths, 2022<ref>Borths, Matthew R., Al-Ashqar, Shorouq F., Sallam, Hesham M., Seiffert, Erik R. "The Oldest Hypercarnovore (Placentalia, Mammalia, Hyaenodonta) from the Fayum Depression, Egypt", in "The Society of Vertebrate Paleontology 82nd annual meeting"</ref>
|type_genus = †Boualitomus|type_genus_authority = Gheerbrant, 2006
|subdivision_ranks = Genera
|subdivision =
 †Boualitomus †Lahimia Incertae sedis:
 †Boualitomidae sp. (Locality BQ-2, Fayum, Egypt)
 †Boualitomidae sp. (Quarry L-41, Fayum, Egypt)
|synonyms =
 Boualitominae 
}}

Boualitomidae ("Bou Alian cutters") is a family of extinct predatory mammals from extinct order Hyaenodonta. Fossil remains of these mammals are known from middle Paleocene to late Eocene deposits in Africa. Boualitomids had only three pairs of premolars in the lower dentition, lacking the first one.

Classification and phylogeny
Taxonomy
 Family: †Boualitomidae 
 Genus: †Boualitomus 
 †Boualitomus marocanensis 
 Genus: †Lahimia 
 †Lahimia selloumi 
 Incertae sedis'':
 †Boualitomidae sp. (Locality BQ-2, Fayum, Egypt) 
 †Boualitomidae sp. (Quarry L-41, Fayum, Egypt)

Phylogeny 
The phylogenetic relationships of family Boualitomidae are shown in the following cladogram:

See also
 Mammal classification
 Hyaenodonta

References

Hyaenodonts
Paleogene mammals of Africa
Prehistoric mammal families